"Fall", written by Clay Mills, Sonny LeMaire, and Shane Minor, is a song that has been recorded by both country singer Clay Walker and pop singer Kimberley Locke, both of whom are signed to Curb Records. Both versions were released within weeks of each other, in mid-2007. While Walker's version was released to country radio, Locke's went to adult contemporary radio format. Walker's reached number five on the U.S. country singles charts and Locke's achieved number one on the U.S. dance charts. Go West frontman Peter Cox recorded a version of "Fall" on his 2010 album, The S1 Sessions.

Content
"Fall" is a mid-tempo ballad in which the narrator addresses a lover who has had a bad day. The narrator then offers moral support to the lover: "Fall, go on and lose it all / Every doubt, every fear / Every worry, every tear".

Clay Walker version
Walker's version, the first version of the song to be released, was the second single from his 2007 album, which was also titled Fall. A music video was issued on October 17, 2007.

Background
Walker stated that Fall was one of his favorite songs on his album. He also said after recording the track that “Keith stood up and high-fived the engineer when we got done with the vocal and I thought, that’s the first that I’ve ever seen that, maybe he was just glad that I got all the lyrics right, it was refreshing to know there wasn’t a lot of wasted time in the studio with Keith. He knows what he wants and he communicates that with the musicians really well."

In an interview with The Flint Journal Walker said, "'Fall' was a huge hit for us. I think people are going to want to see us and ticket sales are already going up. As long as people want to hear us -- and I feel like they do -- we're going to get out and give it to them."

Critical reception
Chuck Taylor of Billboard wrote "Walker's rich, confident baritone offers all the more reassurance, as does his self-assured smile". Kevin John Coyne of Country Universe gave the song a B+ rating and wrote, "This is another good single from an artist who has fully come into his own."

Music video
Roman White directed the song's music video.

Live performances
Walker performed the song on The Montel Williams Show on April 11, 2008.

Chart performance
His version of the song debuted at #59 on the Hot Country Songs chart dated April 7, 2007. It charted for 37 weeks and peaked at #5 on the country chart dated November 17, 2007. It became his first Top Ten country hit since "I Can't Sleep", which reached #9 in late 2003-early 2004. This version also peaked at #56 on the Billboard Hot 100, his first peak on that chart since "I Can't Sleep".

Charts

Year-end charts

Kimberley Locke version

Kimberley Locke covered the song as the third single from her album Based on a True Story, which was released only 2 weeks after Clay Walker's album. Locke's version was released to Adult Contemporary radio on February 25, 2008, with club remixes following in April.

Billboard reviewed the single as "a stunning showcase for the versatile vocalist" and suggests this may be her most satisfying single yet along with "8th World Wonder".

Track listings and formats
US promotional single - CURBD-2073
 "Fall (radio edit) - 3:16

US promotional remixes maxi single - CURBD-2087
 "Fall" (Bimbo Jones extended mix) - 7:22
 "Fall" (Almighty club mix) - 7:03
 "Fall" (Piper extended club mix) - 7:48
 "Fall" (Scotty K vocal Klub mix) - 6:54
 "Fall" (Almighty dub) - 6:40
 "Fall" (Bimbo Jones radio edit) - 3:33
 "Fall" (Almighty radio edit) - 3:21
 "Fall" (Piper radio edit) - 3:53
 "Fall" (Scotty K radio edit) - 3:48

Digital maxi single / The Radio Edits EP
 "Fall" (Bimbo Jones radio edit) - 3:32
 "Fall" (Almighty radio edit) - 3:22
 "Fall" (Piper radio edit) - 3:53
 "Fall" (Scotty K radio edit) - 3:48

Digital maxi single / The Extended Mixes EP
 "Fall" (Bimbo Jones extended mix) - 7:21
 "Fall" (Almighty club mix) - 7:03
 "Fall" (Piper extended club mix) - 7:47
 "Fall" (Scotty K vocal Klub mix) - 6:54

Chart performance

See also
 Number-one dance hits of 2008 (USA)

References

Clay Walker songs
Kimberley Locke songs
2007 singles
2008 singles
Songs written by Shane Minor
Music videos directed by Roman White
Songs written by Clay Mills
Song recordings produced by Keith Stegall
Curb Records singles
Songs written by Sonny LeMaire
2007 songs